Tolbert is a surname. Notable people with the surname include: 

Berlinda Tolbert (born 1949), American film and television actress, The Jeffersons
Caroline Tolbert, American political scientist
Emanuel Tolbert (born 1958), American football player
Frank X. Tolbert (1912–1984), American historian, newspaper columnist, and restaurateur
Jalen Tolbert (born 1999), American football player
Jim Tolbert (born 1944), American football player
John Tolbert, American local education activist 
Lynda Tolbert-Goode (born 1967), American hurdler and sprinter
Margaret E. M. Tolbert (born 1943), American chemist
Matt Tolbert (born 1982), American baseball player
Mike Tolbert (born 1985), American football player
Miles Tolbert, Secretary of the Environment of the State of Oklahoma
Paden Tolbert (1870–1904), American law enforcement officer and railroad agent
Ray Tolbert (born 1958), American basketball player
Skeets Tolbert (1909–2000), American jazz clarinetist, saxophonist, and band leader
Stacey Lovelace-Tolbert (born 1974), American basketball player
Stephen A. Tolbert (1921–1975), Liberian politician and businessman
Tom Tolbert (born 1965), American basketball player and sports broadcaster
Tony Tolbert (born 1967), American football player
Tyke Tolbert (contemporary), American football player and coach
Victoria Tolbert (1916–1997), First Lady of Liberia
William R. Tolbert, Jr. (1913–1980), President of Liberia 1971–80

given name
Tolbert Lanston, American founder of Monotype

See also
 Tolbert, Netherlands, a town in the Netherlands